Matthew Kennedy (born 1 November 1994) is a Northern Irish professional footballer who plays as a winger for Scottish Premiership club Aberdeen. Having represented Scotland at youth international level, he has represented Northern Ireland at senior international level.

He began his career at Kilmarnock, and represented Scotland at all youth international levels. He was sold to Everton in August 2012, and was loaned out to Tranmere Rovers, Milton Keynes Dons, and Hibernian, before being sold on to Cardiff City in February 2015. Initially a first team regular at Cardiff, he was dropped in the 2015–16 season and joined Port Vale on loan in January 2016, and then Plymouth Argyle on loan in January 2017; he helped Plymouth to achieve promotion out of EFL League Two at the end of the season. He joined Portsmouth on loan for the 2017–18 season.

Kennedy returned to Scottish football in July 2018, signing with St Johnstone. He moved to Aberdeen in January 2020.

Career

Kilmarnock
Kennedy had the opportunity to join the youth academies of Celtic and Rangers, but chose to join Kilmarnock as the club were closer to his home in South Ayrshire and he felt played a style of football that suited him. On 19 November 2011, aged 17, Kennedy made his first team debut as a substitute in a 1–1 draw with Hibernian at Easter Road. He started his first game for "Killie" in a 2–1 win over St Mirren at Rugby Park on 2 January 2012. He ended the 2011–12 campaign with 11 Scottish Premier League appearances. He played three games at the start of the 2012–13 season before leaving the club; manager Kenny Shiels expressed his concern that Kennedy had left Kilmarnock too soon and he had missed out on seeing Kennedy's "proper development" at the club.

Everton
On 31 August 2012, the final day of the summer transfer window, Kennedy signed for English Premier League side Everton for a "nominal fee". The fee was later revealed to be £225,000. In a later interview he stated that "I’ve got nothing but praise for their academy. I don’t think you could have a better youth set up. My coaches were David Unsworth, Alan Stubbs and David Weir."

On 9 January 2014, Kennedy signed on loan for League One side Tranmere Rovers. Manager Ronnie Moore extended the loan spell for a further month after being impressed by his first six appearances at Prenton Park. On 26 March 2014, Kennedy joined Milton Keynes Dons, also of League One, on a youth loan until the end of the 2013–14 season. Manager Karl Robinson stated that Kennedy would bring "pace, trickery and excitement" to Stadium mk. He scored his first goal in the English Football League for the "Dons" in a 2–2 draw at Rotherham United on 26 April.

On 8 August 2014, Kennedy joined Scottish Championship side Hibernian on a six-month loan deal after being signed by his former Everton under-21 manager Alan Stubbs. He initially found himself on the bench at Easter Road, though Stubbs was keen to extend the loan deal until the end of the 2014–15 season. On 29 October, he scored his second senior goal to help secure a 3–3 draw with Dundee United in the Scottish League Cup quarter-finals, however he missed his penalty in the resulting shoot-out. He said that he was "devastated" by his miss, which eliminated "Hibs" from the competition. He returned to Goodison Park on 5 January.

Cardiff City

On 2 February 2015, Kennedy signed for Championship side Cardiff City on a three-and-a-half-year contract for an undisclosed fee. He made his full debut for the "Bluebirds" 15 days later in a 1–1 draw with Blackburn Rovers at Cardiff City Stadium, playing the full 90 minutes and producing a Man of the Match performance. He settled in well at the club, and was touted as one of manager Russell Slade's best signings for the club. He made a total of 14 league appearances in the second half of the 2014–15 season.

Kennedy was described as a "forgotten man" after playing just one league game in the first half of the 2015–16 season. On 25 January 2016, he joined League One side Port Vale on a one-month loan. He said that he was attracted to the "Valiants" by manager Rob Page, who Cardiff coaches told him was the best man to bring out his best qualities. He began his time at Vale Park in good form, and was hopeful of extending his stay further than the initial month. After late negotiations, Cardiff agreed to extend the loan until 26 April. However, he returned to Cardiff on 7 April after being demoted from the first eleven to a place on the bench. Page said that "to go from under-21s football to playing week-in, week-out, two games a week at League One level caught up with him".

On 31 January 2017, he joined EFL League Two club Plymouth Argyle on loan until the end of the 2016–17 season. Cardiff manager Neil Warnock predicted that Kennedy would "set the league alight" for the "Pilgrims", and his words were vindicated early on as Kennedy picked up two-man of the match awards as he scored in three consecutive games – including an "outstanding" goal in a victory over West Country derby rivals Exeter City at Home Park. He went on to be nominated for the EFL League Two Player of the Month award for February. He scored five goals in 17 games to help Argyle to win promotion as runners-up of League Two.

On 31 August 2017, Kennedy joined Cardiff teammate Stuart O'Keefe on loan at League One side Portsmouth for the 2017–18 season. He had impressed "Pompey" manager Kenny Jackett playing against the club in the EFL Cup earlier in the month. He scored his first goal for the club in a 3–1 defeat at Northampton Town on 12 September. After a good start to his time at Fratton Park he suffered a dip in form and ended up becoming a bit-part player, which assistant manager Joe Gallen blamed on Kennedy over-thinking his play. At the end of the 2017–18 season, Kennedy was released by Cardiff upon the expiration of his contract on 30 June.

St Johnstone
On 21 July 2018, Kennedy signed a two-year deal with Scottish Premiership club St Johnstone. Manager Tommy Wright said that it was a "real coup for us" to sign the winger. On 3 April 2019, he scored in a 2–0 win over Tayside derby rivals Dundee at McDiarmid Park. He ended the 2018–19 season with seven goals in 41 appearances as the "Saints" posted a seventh-place finish.

Aberdeen
Kennedy signed a pre-contract agreement with Aberdeen on 15 January 2020. Nine days later he joined Aberdeen on a three-and-a-half-year deal. The "Dons" were reported to have paid a transfer fee of £75,000 plus add-ons. Manager Derek McInnes had been reported to have been tracking Kennedy for the previous nine years. By the time the 2019–20 season was halted due to the COVID-19 pandemic in Scotland, Kennedy had six goals (all for St Johnstone) and eight assists and said he was just starting to show his best form.

In August 2020 he was one of eight Aberdeen players who received a suspended three-match ban from the Scottish Football Association (SFA) after they breached coronavirus-related restrictions by visiting a bar earlier in the month. He made a total of 35 appearances throughout the 2020–21 season, helping Aberdeen to post a fourth-place finish in the league. He scored just the one goal, a consolation in a 2–1 defeat to Rangers at Pittodrie.

In August 2021, he was linked with a loan move to St Mirren – manager Jim Goodwin was reported to be a keen admirer of his – after falling out of favour under new manager Stephen Glass. A spinal problem (diagnosed as stress fractures) caused him to miss the first half of the 2021–22 season, and he made his first appearance at the end of January 2022. He made a further eight appearances before the season's end, though Goodwin – now manager of Aberdeen – did not want to rush him back too soon.

International career

Scotland youth
Kennedy has represented Scotland at under-15, under-16, under-17 and under-19 level. He was selected by under-21 interim coach Ricky Sbragia to play Portugal under-21 at Estádio do Bonfim, Setúbal on 14 November 2012; he came on for Callum Paterson 66 minutes into a 3–2 defeat, in what was his only under-21 cap.

Northern Ireland
In September 2019, it was reported that Kennedy was due to switch his international allegiance to the country of his birth, Northern Ireland. He was pictured training with the senior Northern Ireland squad ahead of a friendly with Luxembourg. He was called up to the Northern Ireland senior squad on 3 October. He made his debut for Northern Ireland on 18 November 2020, in a 1–1 draw with Romania in the UEFA Nations League. He was recalled to the squad in March 2022.

Style of play
Able to play on either wing, Kennedy was described by Tranmere Rovers manager Ronnie Moore as "quick, [he] likes to take on defenders and [is someone] will create chances for his team-mates".

Career statistics

Club statistics

International statistics

Honours
Plymouth Argyle
EFL League Two second-place promotion: 2016–17

References

External links

1994 births
Living people
Association footballers from Belfast
Footballers from South Ayrshire
People from Northern Ireland of Scottish descent
Association footballers from Northern Ireland
Northern Ireland international footballers
Scottish footballers
Scotland youth international footballers
Scotland under-21 international footballers
Association football wingers
Kilmarnock F.C. players
Everton F.C. players
Tranmere Rovers F.C. players
Milton Keynes Dons F.C. players
Hibernian F.C. players
Cardiff City F.C. players
Port Vale F.C. players
Plymouth Argyle F.C. players
Portsmouth F.C. players
St Johnstone F.C. players
Aberdeen F.C. players
Scottish Premier League players
English Football League players
Scottish Professional Football League players